Ferdinand Graft Brickwedde (26 March 1903 – 29 March 1989), a physicist at the National Bureau of Standards (now the National Institute of Standards and Technology), in 1931 produced the first sample of hydrogen in which the spectrum of its heavy isotope, deuterium, could be observed.  This was a critical step in the discovery of deuterium, for which Brickwedde's collaborator, Harold Urey, was awarded the Nobel Prize in Chemistry in 1934.

Biography
He was born on 26 March 1903 in Baltimore, Maryland. His parents were the photographer Ferdinand Henry (* 1878 in New York) and Virginia (Graft) Brickwedde (* 1874 in Illinois).
 
Brickwedde was educated at Johns Hopkins University, B.A. 1922, M.A. 1924, and Ph.D. 1925. An  endowed lectureship in his name is maintained there. In 1925 he joined the National Bureau of Standards as a postdoctoral Mansell Research Associate, was promoted to Chief of its Low Temperature Laboratory in 1926, and became Chief of its Heat and Power Division in 1946.

In 1939, Brickwedde served as president of the Philosophical Society of Washington, a scientific organization. In 1956, Brickwedde was appointed Dean of the College of Chemistry and Physics at the
Pennsylvania State University.  He served in this position until 1963, and then was appointed Evan Pugh Research Professor of Physics Emeritus, in which position he served until his death on 29 March 1989 in Linwood, New Jersey.

References

External links
 "A Hydrogen Isotope of Mass 2," Harold C. Urey, F. G. Brickwedde and G. M. Murphy, The Physical Review, v. 39, pp. 164-165 (1932)
 Account of the discovery of deuterium
 Obituary in the New York Times

1903 births
1989 deaths
20th-century American physicists
Department of Commerce Gold Medal
Johns Hopkins University alumni
Pennsylvania State University faculty
People from Linwood, New Jersey
Fellows of the American Physical Society